Mashuna mashuna, the Mashuna ringlet, is a butterfly in the family Nymphalidae. It is found in Zimbabwe. The habitat consists of marshy areas in savanna and grassland.

The larvae feed on Cynodon species.

References

Satyrini
Butterflies of Africa
Endemic fauna of Zimbabwe
Insects of Zimbabwe
Butterflies described in 1895